Louis Lenart (April 24, 1921 – July 20, 2015) was a Hungarian-born American-Israeli fighter pilot. His exploits during the 1948 Arab-Israeli War were documented in the 2015 film A Wing and a Prayer.

Early life
Lenart was born in Hungary as Lajos Lenovitz to a Jewish family in 1921, in the village of Sátoraljaújhely, near the Czech border. His parents were farmers. When he was ten, the family immigrated to the United States, settling in the Pennsylvania mining town of Wilkes-Barre, where his parents ran a small store. As a boy, he endured antisemitic taunts and beatings.

Marine service
After finishing high school and taking a bodybuilding course, Lenart enlisted in the United States Marine Corps. After 18 months of infantry training, he was accepted into flight school. During flight training, he was severely injured in a mid-air collision. He saw action in the Pacific Theater of World War II as an F4U Corsair pilot, serving in the Battle of Okinawa and in bombing missions over Japan. He was discharged from the Marines at the end of the war with the rank of captain.

Israeli Air Force

After learning that 14 relatives including his grandmother had been murdered in the Auschwitz concentration camp and attending a lecture on Zionism, Lenart decided to volunteer for Sherut Avir, the precursor to the Israeli Air Force. He took part in the clandestine smuggling of salvaged Czech-supplied warplanes to Palestine shortly before Israeli independence, flying them past the British blockade. He became a fighter pilot following the Israeli Declaration of Independence and the outbreak of the 1948 Arab-Israeli War, flying the Avia S-199 fighter plane.

On May 29, 1948, Lenart took part in Operation Pleshet, when the Israeli Air Force launched its entire fleet of four fighter aircraft in a desperate attempt to halt an Egyptian advance on Tel Aviv, in coordination with a ground counterattack. This was the first use of Israeli fighter planes in combat, and Lenart, the most experienced of the pilots, commanded the mission. Although the attack was highly disorganized and did minimal damage, it had a profound psychological effect on the Egyptians, who had been assured that the Israelis had no aircraft. Egyptian forces subsequently halted their advance and retreated.

Later life
After the war, Lenart participated in Operation Ezra and Nehemiah, the airlift of Iraqi Jews to Israel in the early 1950s, served as a pilot for El Al, and flew aerial mapping missions over the jungles of Central America. He produced six feature films. Lenart’s final movie project had the working title “First Strike,” and used Operation Opera the 7 June 1981 attack on Iraq’s reactor as a story line. The script was written by his friend Lynn Garrison who would also direct the aerial sequences.    Lenart was the general manager of the Los Angeles Clippers in the early 1980s. He maintained homes in Israel and Los Angeles, and upon his retirement, settled permanently in Israel.

Lenart died on July 20, 2015, at his home in Ra'anana, Israel, of congestive heart failure, at the age of 94. He was survived by his wife Rachel, his daughter Michal (who had also served in the Israeli Air Force) and a grandson.

Decorations
Lenart received the following awards during his service with the U.S. Marine Corps:

Lenart received the following decoration for his service in the Israeli Air Force:

References

External links 
 Lou Lenart at the Internet Movie Database

1921 births
2015 deaths
Hungarian Jews
American people of Hungarian-Jewish descent
Jewish American military personnel
United States Marine Corps pilots of World War II
Israeli people of the 1948 Arab–Israeli War
United States Marine Corps officers
Recipients of the Air Medal
Hungarian emigrants to the United States
American emigrants to Israel
21st-century American Jews
People from Sátoraljaújhely